Lermontovka is a rural locality (a selo) and the administrative center of Lermontovsky Selsoviet of Tambovsky District, Amur Oblast, Russia. The population was 737 as of 2018. There are 11  streets.

Geography 
Lermontovka is located 17 km west of Tambovka (the district's administrative centre) by road. Tambovka is the nearest rural locality.

References 

Rural localities in Tambovsky District, Amur Oblast